is a passenger railway station located in the city of Hino, Tokyo, Japan, operated by the private railway company, Keio Corporation.

Lines 
Minamidaira Station is served by the Keio Line, and is located 32.1 kilometers from the starting point of the line at Shinjuku Station.

Station layout 
This station consists of two opposed ground-level side platforms serving two tracks, connected by a footbridge.

Platforms

History
The station opened on April 28, 1926.

Passenger statistics
In fiscal 2019, the station was used by an average of 10,722 passengers daily. 

The passenger figures for previous years are as shown below.

Surrounding area
 Tokyo Metropolitan Road No. 173 
Minamidaira Hill Park
Ministry of the Environment Waterbird Relief Training Center
Wild Bird Society of Japan Bird and Green International Center
Tokyo Metropolitan Minamidaira High School

See also
 List of railway stations in Japan

References

External links

 Keio Railway Station Information 

Keio Line
Stations of Keio Corporation
Railway stations in Tokyo
Railway stations in Japan opened in 1926
Hino, Tokyo